Juan Carrasco may refer to:

 Juan Carrasco (apologist) (died c. 1670), apologist, sometimes called Carrasco of Madrid
 Juan Carrasco (high jumper) (born 1958), Spanish Olympic athlete
 Juan Carrasco (explorer), Spanish naval officer, explorer and navigator
 Juan Carrasco (general) (1878–1922), Mexican military general
 Juan Ignacio Carrasco (born 1974), former tennis player from Spain
 Juan Pablo Carrasco (born 1992), Chilean footballer
 Juan Ramón Carrasco (born 1956), Uruguayan football coach and former player
 Juan Manuel Carrasco (born 1976), Peruvian lawyer and Minister of the Interior